Anemopaegma arvense is a medicinal plant native to Cerrado vegetation in Brazil.

References

arvense
Flora of Brazil